Jerry Angus (born 12 May 1960) is a Guyanese cricketer. He played in fourteen first-class and three List A matches for Guyana and Berbice from 1979 to 1990.

See also
 List of Guyanese representative cricketers

References

External links
 

1960 births
Living people
Guyanese cricketers
Guyana cricketers
Berbice cricketers
People from New Amsterdam, Guyana